Essentialism is the view that objects have a set of attributes that are necessary to their identity. In early Western thought, Plato's idealism held that all things have such an "essence"—an "idea" or "form". In Categories, Aristotle similarly proposed that all objects have a substance that, as George Lakoff put it, "make the thing what it is, and without which it would be not that kind of thing". The contrary view—non-essentialism—denies the need to posit such an "essence'".

Essentialism has been controversial from its beginning. Plato, in the Parmenides dialogue, depicts Socrates questioning the notion, suggesting that if we accept the idea that every beautiful thing or just action partakes of an essence to be beautiful or just, we must also accept the "existence of separate essences for hair, mud, and dirt". In biology and other natural sciences, essentialism provided the rationale for taxonomy at least until the time of Charles Darwin; the role and importance of essentialism in biology is still a matter of debate.

Historically, beliefs which posit that social identities such as ethnicity, nationality or gender are essential characteristics have in many cases been shown to have destructive or harmful results. It has been argued by some that Essentialist thinking lies at the core of many reductive, discriminatory or extremist ideologies. Psychological essentialism is also correlated with racial prejudice. In medical sciences, essentialism can lead to a reified view of identities—for example assuming that differences in hypertension in Afro-American populations are due to racial differences rather than social causes—leading to fallacious conclusions and potentially unequal treatment. Older social theories were often conceptually essentialist.

In philosophy
An essence characterizes a substance or a form, in the sense of the forms and ideas in Platonic idealism. It is permanent, unalterable, and eternal, and is present in every possible world. Classical humanism has an essentialist conception of the human, in its endorsement of the notion of an eternal and unchangeable human nature. This has been criticized by Kierkegaard, Marx, Heidegger, Sartre, Badiou and many other existential, materialist and anti-humanist thinkers.

In Plato's philosophy (in particular, the Timaeus and the Philebus), things were said to come into being by the action of a demiurge who works to form chaos into ordered entities. Many definitions of essence hark back to the ancient Greek hylomorphic understanding of the formation of the things. According to that account, the structure and real existence of any thing can be understood by analogy to an artefact produced by a craftsperson. The craftsperson requires hyle (timber or wood) and a model, plan or idea in their own mind, according to which the wood is worked to give it the indicated contour or form (morphe). Aristotle was the first to use the terms hyle and morphe. According to his explanation, all entities have two aspects: "matter" and "form". It is the particular form imposed that gives some matter its identity—its quiddity or "whatness" (i.e., its "what it is").

Plato was one of the first essentialists, postulating the concept of ideal forms—an abstract entity of which individual objects are mere facsimiles. To give an example: the ideal form of a circle is a perfect circle, something that is physically impossible to make manifest; yet the circles we draw and observe clearly have some idea in common—the ideal form. Plato proposed that these ideas are eternal and vastly superior to their manifestations, and that we understand these manifestations in the material world by comparing and relating them to their respective ideal form. Plato's forms are regarded as patriarchs to essentialist dogma simply because they are a case of what is intrinsic and a-contextual of objects—the abstract properties that make them what they are. (For more on forms, read Plato's parable of the cave.)

Karl Popper splits the ambiguous term realism into essentialism and realism. He uses essentialism whenever he means the opposite of nominalism, and realism only as opposed to idealism. Popper himself is a realist as opposed to an idealist, but a methodological nominalist as opposed to an essentialist. For example, statements like "a puppy is a young dog" should be read from right to left, as an answer to "What shall we call a young dog"; never from left to right as an answer to "What is a puppy?"

Metaphysical essentialism
Essentialism, in its broadest sense, is any philosophy that acknowledges the primacy of essence. Unlike existentialism, which posits "being" as the fundamental reality, the essentialist ontology must be approached from a metaphysical perspective. Empirical knowledge is developed from experience of a relational universe whose components and attributes are defined and measured in terms of intellectually constructed laws. Thus, for the scientist, reality is explored as an evolutionary system of diverse entities, the order of which is determined by the principle of causality.

Plato believed that the universe was perfect and that its observed imperfections came from man's limited perception of it. For Plato, there were two realities: the "essential" or ideal and the "perceived". Aristotle (384–322 BC) applied the term essence to that which things in a category have in common and without which they cannot be members of that category (for example, rationality is the essence of man; without rationality a creature cannot be a man). In his critique of Aristotle's philosophy, Bertrand Russell said that his concept of essence transferred to metaphysics what was only a verbal convenience and that it confused the properties of language with the properties of the world. In fact, a thing's "essence" consisted in those defining properties without which we could not use the name for it. Although the concept of essence was "hopelessly muddled" it became part of every philosophy until modern times.

The Egyptian-born philosopher Plotinus (204–270 AD) brought idealism to the Roman Empire as Neoplatonism, and with it the concept that not only do all existents emanate from a "primary essence" but that the mind plays an active role in shaping or ordering the objects of perception, rather than passively receiving empirical data.

Despite the metaphysical basis for the term, academics in science, aesthetics, heuristics, psychology, and gender-based sociological studies have advanced their causes under the banner of essentialism. Possibly the clearest definition for this philosophy was offered by gay/lesbian rights advocate Diana Fuss, who wrote: "Essentialism is most commonly understood as a belief in the real, true essence of things, the invariable and fixed properties which define the 'whatness' of a given entity." Metaphysical essentialism stands diametrically opposed to existential realism in that finite existence is only differentiated appearance, whereas "ultimate reality" is held to be absolute essence.

In psychology

There is a difference between metaphysical essentialism (see above) and psychological essentialism, the latter referring not to an actual claim about the world but a claim about a way of representing entities in cognitions (Medin, 1989). Influential in this area is Susan Gelman, who has outlined many domains in which children and adults construe classes of entities, particularly biological entities, in essentialist terms—i.e., as if they had an immutable underlying essence which can be used to predict unobserved similarities between members of that class. (Toosi & Ambady, 2011). This causal relationship is unidirectional; an observable feature of an entity does not define the underlying essence (Dar-Nimrod & Heine, 2011).

In developmental psychology
Essentialism has emerged as an important concept in psychology, particularly developmental psychology. Gelman and Kremer (1991) studied the extent to which children from 4–7 years old demonstrate essentialism. Children were able to identify the cause of behaviour in living and non-living objects. Children understood that underlying essences predicted observable behaviours. Participants could correctly describe living objects' behaviour as self-perpetuated and non-living objects as a result of an adult influencing the object's actions. This is a biological way of representing essential features in cognitions. Understanding the underlying causal mechanism for behaviour suggests essentialist thinking (Rangel and Keller, 2011).
Younger children were unable to identify causal mechanisms of behaviour whereas older children were able to. This suggests that essentialism is rooted in cognitive development. It can be argued that there is a shift in the way that children represent entities, from not understanding the causal mechanism of the underlying essence to showing sufficient understanding (Demoulin, Leyens & Yzerbyt, 2006).

There are four key criteria that constitute essentialist thinking. The first facet is the aforementioned individual causal mechanisms (del Rio & Strasser, 2011). The second is innate potential: the assumption that an object will fulfill its predetermined course of development (Kanovsky, 2007). According to this criterion, essences predict developments in entities that will occur throughout its lifespan. The third is immutability (Holtz & Wagner, 2009). Despite altering the superficial appearance of an object it does not remove its essence. Observable changes in features of an entity are not salient enough to alter its essential characteristics. The fourth is inductive potential (Birnbaum, Deeb, Segall, Ben-Aliyahu & Diesendruck, 2010). This suggests that entities may share common features but are essentially different. However similar two beings may be, their characteristics will be at most analogous, differing most importantly in essences.

The implications of psychological essentialism are numerous. Prejudiced individuals have been found to endorse exceptionally essential ways of thinking, suggesting that essentialism may perpetuate exclusion among social groups (Morton, Hornsey & Postmes, 2009). For example, essentialism of nationality has been linked to anti-immigration attitudes(Rad & Ginges, 2018). In multiple studies in India and the United States, Rad & Ginges (2018) showed that in lay view, a person's nationality is considerably fixed at birth, even if that person is adopted and raised by a family of another nationality at day one and never told about their origin. This may be due to an over-extension of an essential-biological mode of thinking stemming from cognitive development. Paul Bloom of Yale University has stated that "one of the most exciting ideas in cognitive science is the theory that people have a default assumption that things, people and events have invisible essences that make them what they are. Experimental psychologists have argued that essentialism underlies our understanding of the physical and social worlds, and developmental and cross-cultural psychologists have proposed that it is instinctive and universal. We are natural-born essentialists." Scholars suggest that the categorical nature of essentialist thinking predicts the use of stereotypes and can be targeted in the application of stereotype prevention (Bastian & Haslam, 2006).

In ethics
Classical essentialists claim that some things are wrong in an absolute sense. For example, murder breaks a universal, objective and natural moral law and not merely an advantageous, socially or ethically constructed one.

Many modern essentialists claim that right and wrong are moral boundaries that are individually constructed; in other words, things that are ethically right or wrong are actions that the individual deems to be beneficial or harmful, respectively.

In biology

Before evolution was developed as a scientific theory, there existed an essentialist view of biology that posited all species to be unchanging throughout time. The historian Mary P. Winsor has argued that biologists such as Louis Agassiz in the 19th century believed that taxa such as species and genus were fixed, reflecting the mind of the creator. Some religious opponents of evolution continue to maintain this view of biology.

Recent work by historians of systematic biology has, however, cast doubt upon this view of pre-Darwinian thinkers. Winsor, Ron Amundson and Staffan Müller-Wille have each argued that in fact the usual suspects (such as Linnaeus and the Ideal Morphologists) were very far from being essentialists, and it appears that the so-called "essentialism story" (or "myth") in biology is a result of conflating the views expressed by philosophers from Aristotle onwards through to John Stuart Mill and William Whewell in the immediately pre-Darwinian period, using biological examples, with the use of terms in biology like species.

Gender essentialism 

In feminist theory and gender studies, gender essentialism is the attribution of fixed essences to men and women—this  idea that men and women are fundamentally different continues to be a matter of contention. Women's essence is assumed to be universal and is generally identified with those characteristics viewed as being specifically feminine. These ideas of femininity are usually biologized and are often preoccupied with psychological characteristics, such as nurturance, empathy, support, and non-competitiveness, etc. Feminist theorist Elizabeth Grosz states in her 1995 publication Space, time and perversion: essays on the politics of bodies that essentialism "entails the belief that those characteristics defined as women's essence are shared in common by all women at all times. It implies a limit of the variations and possibilities of change—it is not possible for a subject to act in a manner contrary to her essence. Her essence underlies all the apparent variations differentiating women from each other. Essentialism thus refers to the existence of fixed characteristic, given attributes, and ahistorical functions that limit the possibilities of change and thus of social reorganization."

Gender essentialism is pervasive in popular culture, as illustrated by the #1 New York Times best seller Men Are from Mars, Women Are from Venus, but this essentialism is routinely critiqued in introductory women's studies textbooks such as Women: Images & Realities.

Starting in the 1980s, some feminist writers have put forward essentialist theories about gender and science. Evelyn Fox Keller, Sandra Harding,
 and Nancy Tuana
 argued that the modern scientific enterprise is inherently patriarchal and incompatible with women's nature.  Other feminist scholars, such as Ann Hibner Koblitz, Lenore Blum, Mary Gray, Mary Beth Ruskai, and Pnina Abir-Am and Dorinda Outram have criticized those theories for ignoring the diverse nature of scientific research and the tremendous variation in women's experiences in different cultures and historical periods.

In historiography 
Essentialism in history as a field of study entails discerning and listing essential cultural characteristics of a particular nation or culture, in the belief that a people or culture can be understood in this way. Sometimes such essentialism leads to claims of a praiseworthy national or cultural identity, or to its opposite, the condemnation of a culture based on presumed essential characteristics. Herodotus, for example, claims that Egyptian culture is essentially feminized and possesses a "softness" which has made Egypt easy to conquer. To what extent Herodotus was an essentialist is a matter of debate; he is also credited with not essentializing the concept of the Athenian identity, or differences between the Greeks and the Persians that are the subject of his Histories.

Essentialism had been operative in colonialism as well as in critiques of colonialism.

Post-colonial theorists such as Edward Said insisted that essentialism was the "defining mode" of "Western" historiography and ethnography until the nineteenth century and even after, according to Touraj Atabaki, manifesting itself in the historiography of the Middle East and Central Asia as Eurocentrism, over-generalization, and reductionism.

Today, most historians, social scientists and humanists reject methodologies associated with essentialism, though some have argued that certain varieties of essentialism may be useful or even necessary.

See also
Determinism
Educational essentialism
Moral panic
Nature vs. nurture
New essentialism
Pleasure
Poststructuralism
Primordialism
Social constructionism
Structuralism
Traditionalist School
Vitalism

Political acceptation: Identity politics, Strategic essentialism, Ethnic nationalism

References

Notes

Bibliography

Further reading
 Runes, Dagobert D. (1972) Dictionary of Philosophy (Littlefield, Adams & Co.). See for instance the articles on "Essence", p. 97; "Quiddity", p. 262; "Form", p. 110; "Hylomorphism", p. 133; "Individuation", p. 145; and "Matter", p. 191.
 Barrett, H. C. (2001). On the functional origins of essentialism. Mind and Society, 3, Vol. 2, 1–30.
 Sayer, Andrew (August 1997) "Essentialism, Social Constructionism, and Beyond", Sociological Review 45 : 456.
 Oderberg, David S. (2007) Real Essentialism New York, Routledge.
 Cattarini, L.S. (2018) Beyond Sartre and Sterility (Montreal),  argues for priority of essence/conscience over existence/consciousness

External links

 
 
 

 
Metaphysical theories
Philosophical theories